700 Sundays is an autobiography written by Billy Crystal. The title refers to the number of Sundays shared by Billy and his father, Jack Crystal, who died when Billy was 15.

Broadway
Crystal's stage adaptation was originally produced in 2004 as a "Page To Stage" production at La Jolla Playhouse. Opening on a Sunday in December 2004 at the Broadhurst Theatre, the one-man show won the 2005 Tony Award for Special Theatrical Event.

In 2013, a 54-performance revival was staged at the Imperial Theatre. HBO filmed the January 3–4, 2014 performances; the filmed version of 700 Sundays debuted on the network on April 19, 2014.

References

American autobiographies
Tony Award-winning plays
Broadway plays
2004 plays
2013 plays
Works by Billy Crystal